Anthony B. Bradley is an American author and professor of religion, theology and ethics at the King's College in New York City, where he also serves as the chair of the Religious and Theological Studies program and directs the Galsworthy Criminal Justice Reform Program. He is also a research fellow for The Acton Institute.

Early life and education
Bradley has a BS in biological sciences from Clemson University, a Master of Divinity from Covenant Theological Seminary, a Master of Arts in Ethics and Society from Fordham University, and his PhD is from Westminster Theological Seminary. Before coming to King's, he was assistant professor of theology at Covenant Seminary from 2005 to 2009, where he also directed the Francis A. Schaeffer Institute.

Career
Bradley's 2013 book, Aliens in the Promised Land, is a minority-led conversation about racism in the U.S. evangelical church.

In his 2015 book Runaway Radical, author Jonathan Hollingsworth identifies Bradley as the first to identify a new kind of evangelical legalism, in which young people feel compelled to enact their devotion to the Gospel by such radical acts as giving away all of their possessions, or dropping out of university to dedicate their lives to serving the poor.

Writings
Liberating Black Theology: The Bible and the Black Experience in America. Wheaton, IL: Crossway Books, 2010.  
Black and Tired: Essays on Race, Politics, Culture, and International Development. Eugene, OR: Wipf & Stock, 2011.  ; C-SPAN, Book TV  
The Political Economy of Liberation: Thomas Sowell and James Cone on the Black Experience. New York, NY: Peter Lang Inc, International Academic Publishers, 2012. 
Keep Your Head Up: America's New Black Christian Leaders, Social Consciousness, and the Cosby Conversation. Wheaton, IL: Crossway, 2012.  
Aliens in the Promised Land: Why Minority Leadership is Overlooked in White Christian Churches. Phillipsburg, NJ: P & R, 2013. ; Edited by Bradley who also wrote the first chapter.
John Rawls and Christian Social Engagement: Justice as Unfairness. London: Lexington, 2014. 
Black Scholars in White Space: New Vistas in African American Studies from the Christian Academy. Cascade Books: Oregon, 2015. 
Something Seems Strange: Critical Essays on Christianity, Public Policy, and Contemporary Culture. Wipf and Stock: Oregon, 2016. 
Ending Overcriminalization and Mass Incarceration: Hope from Civil Society. Cambridge University Press: Cambridge, 2018.

References

External links
Bio of Bradley from "The Institute"
World Magazine Bio
Acton Institute Profile

Living people
Clemson University alumni
Westminster Theological Seminary alumni
Covenant Theological Seminary alumni
Covenant Theological Seminary faculty
The King's College (New York City) faculty
20th-century Calvinist and Reformed theologians
Year of birth missing (living people)
Acton Institute